Zhou Jiahao (born 16 September 1995) is a Chinese footballer currently playing as a forward for Nanjing City.

Career statistics

Club
.

Notes

References

1995 births
Living people
People from Lishui
Footballers from Zhejiang
Chinese footballers
Association football forwards
Segunda División B players
China League Two players
China League One players
Shanghai Shenhua F.C. players
CD Eldense footballers
Shanghai JuJu Sports F.C. players
Cangzhou Mighty Lions F.C. players
Zibo Cuju F.C. players
Chinese expatriate footballers
Chinese expatriate sportspeople in Spain
Expatriate footballers in Spain